HTMS Krabi (OPV-551) is an offshore patrol vessel (OPV) of the Royal Thai Navy. She is a modified , and was built by Mahidol Adulyadej Naval Dockyard, with design and technology transfer support from BAE Systems Surface Ships. Additional construction took place at the Royal Thai Navy Mahidol Dockyard in Sattahip.

Construction 
The contract for the construction of Krabi was signed in June 2009, and construction began in August 2010. Krabi was launched on 3 December 2011 in a ceremony attended by Princess Maha Chakri Sirindhorn. After launch, she began outfitting, and is expected to enter service in 2013. The Thai Navy plans to use Krabi to patrol Thailand's Economic Exclusion Zone (EEZ), as well as for fishery and natural resource protection and disaster relief.

Krabi is 91 meters in length, and carries an Oto Melara 76 mm main gun and two MSI 30mm secondary guns for primary defense, as well as machine guns. It is able to operate an AgustaWestland AW139 helicopter flying from a  flight deck. She is equipped with a Thales Variant surveillance radar, a Thales Lirod Mk2 fire control radar and the Thales Tacticos combat management system.

Operational history 
In October 2013 Krabi participated in the International Fleet Review 2013 in Sydney, Australia. In May 2016 the Royal Thai Navy said it is planning to deploy its new H145M helicopters from HTMS Krabi in service with 202 Squadron.

See also
 List of naval ship classes in service
 River-class patrol vessel (The HTMS Krabi is a modified version of this class)

References

2011 ships
Ships built in Thailand
Krabi-class patrol vessels of the Royal Thai Navy